Malam Mamane Barka (1958/1959 – 21 November 2018) was a Nigerien musician, and one of the world's most prominent players of the biram. He died on 21 November 2018, aged 59.

Biography
Malam Mamane Barka was born in 1958 or 1959 in Tesker, a town in the east of the then autonomous republic of Niger. He came from the nomadic people of Toubou. As a player of the Ngurumi, a two-string plucked instrument, he gained popularity in his homeland and neighboring Nigeria. In 2002 he decided to devote himself to the study of Biram. It is a five-stringed instrument used by the Boudouma, a fishing community on Lake Chad, for traditional songs.

References

External links

1950s births
2018 deaths
20th-century Nigerien musicians
Toubou people
Date of birth unknown
People from Zinder Region